Garden City College now Garden City University is a co-educational college affiliated with Bangalore University, in Bangalore, Karnataka, India. It offers undergraduate and post-graduate courses in management and commerce, media, hospitality and tourism, fashion, paramedical studies, life sciences and information technology. It was established in 1992 and was founded by Joseph V.G, the honorary consul of the Maldives in Bangalore.

The paramedical courses are affiliated to Rajiv Gandhi University of Health Sciences, Bangalore. The college is accredited by the  National Assessment and Accreditation Council.

The college has two campuses, Garden City College of Science and Management Studies and Centre for Higher Learning. The college has 8 hostels which accommodate around 2000 students, covering a total area of 40 acres.

In February 2013, the State Government of Karnataka passed the Garden City University Bill allowing the group to function as a university.

History

Garden City Education Trust was formed in 1992 with the support of like-minded educationists like the late Prof Shivarudrappa – former dean, Karnataka University; late Dr Hanumanthappa who was the vice chancellor of the Bangalore University; Prof V.B. Coutinho, former vice chancellor, Gulbarga University and Prof Rame Gowda, former vice chancellor of the Karnataka State Open University.

The trust began its operations with Garden City College of Science and Management Studies offering programs under the Bangalore University affiliation. The institution went on to bag the highest grade of "A" when assessed by the National Assessment and Accreditation Council – the premier accreditation body under the UGC.

In 2013, the benign Government of Karnataka passed the "Garden City University Act", considering the merits of the Garden City Education Trust. The university is being developed in a green campus spread over 41 acres in Bangalore Rural District.

On 8 March 2019, Garden City University has launched a global campaign titled Useless Challenge.

References

Colleges in Bangalore
1992 establishments in Karnataka
Educational institutions established in 1992